Pablo Alfonso Schwarz Rabinovich (born Santiago, 9 October 1970) is a Chilean actor, noted for his extensive television, theater and film career.

Raised in a family of teachers and actors, he began his theatrical career when he was only 9 years old, acting for the English-speaking company "Santiago Stage". Schwarz has made more than twenty characters for Chilean television and has appeared in more than 20 theatrical works in Chile and the world. Schwarz is widely known for his character "Juan del Burro" in the soap opera Sucupira, broadcast on TVN in 1996. His participation in the film Cachimba by Silvio Caiozzi earned him a nomination for best actor by the Association of Show Journalists, as well as his role as "Iturra" from the series "Bala Loca" gave him the Altazor 2017 as best supporting actor.

He is also dedicated to music, drummer of the band Maraca, which he formed together with the actor Néstor Cantillana. He played in the band Indio Loco alongside musicians and actors Mauricio Diocares, Antonio de la Fuente and Gustavo Becerra, with frequent performances in Santiago and other Chilean cities.

Filmography

Films

Telenovelas

TV series

Theatre
1992 - Historia de la sangre. Teatro de La Memoria. Dirección de Alfredo Castro.
1992 a 1993 - Dédalo en el vientre de la bestia. Teatro de La Memoria. Dirección de Alfredo Castro.
1994 - El Tony Chico, de Luis Alberto Heiremans. Dirección de Cristián Campos - Juanucho.
1994 - La cocinita.
1994 - Esperando a Godot, de Samuel Beckett. Dirección Mauricio Pesutic.
1994 a 1995 - Bent. Dirección de Amílcar Borges.
1996 - Restos humanos y la verdadera naturaleza del amor. Dirección de Francisco Melo.
1997 - Brunch.
2000 - Cinema utoppia, de Ramón Griffero. Teatro Fin de Siglo - “El acomodador”.
2001 - Eva Perón, de Copi. Dirección de Marcial di Fonzo Bo- La enfermera, Eva.
2002 - Edipo de André Gide - Dirección de Carlos Bórquez - Edipo.
2003 a 2004 - En la sangre. Dirección de Carlos Osorio - Susan Lori Parks.
2006 - Desafección - Raúl Miranda para Compañía La Minimale.
2006 a 2007 - ¿Quién se robó La Gioconda?. Escrita y dirigida por Vittorio Di Girolamo
2007 - Sueño con revolver, de Lola Arias. Dirección de Néstor Cantillana - Participación como músico.
2007 a 2008 - Nadie es profeta en su espejo de Jorge Díaz Dirección de Paulina García- El Chema.
2008 - La casa de Dios, de Marco Antonio de la Parra. Dirección: Paulina García - Pedro, el bruto.
2009 - Norte, de Alejandro Moreno. Dirección de Víctor Carrasco.
2009 - Gertrudis, el grito, de Howard Baker, para la Muestra de Dramaturgia Europea - Claudio.
2010 - Jorge González murió, de Pablo Paredes. Dirección de Sebastián Jaña - Jorge.
2011 - El amor es un francotirador, de Lola Arias. Dirección de Néstor Cantillana - El Boxeador.
2011 - Susurrus, de David Leddy. Dirección de Constanza Brieba - Polilla.
2013 - Bailando para ojos muertos de Juan Radrigán. Dirección de Víctor Carrasco - León.
2014 - Sonata para un cuervo. Dirección de Constanza Thümler- Corazón Delator
2016 - Gospodin .De Philipp Löhle. Dirección de Néstor Cantillana- Gospodin
2017 - Noche Mapuche .De Marcelo Leonart. Dirección de Marcelo Leonart- Juan Ignacio
2018 - La Iguana de Alessandra"" , de Ramón Griffero. Dirección de Ramón Griffero para el Teatro Nacional Chileno TNCH
2019 - El Horacio de Heiner Müller Dirección de Néstor Cantillana
2021 - El Ladrido de las Mariposas de Mauricio Pesutic Dirección de Mauricio Pesutic
2021 - The Tempest Project de William Shakespeare Adaptación de Peter Brook Dirección de Peter Brook y Marie Hélène Estienne Rol - Prospero.
2022- Retrato de una mujer que un día miró la Luna y le pareció que era falsa, de Carla Zúñiga. Dirección Manuel Morgado.

References

1970 births
Living people
Chilean male film actors
Chilean male telenovela actors
Chilean male television actors
20th-century Chilean male actors
21st-century Chilean male actors
People from Santiago
Chilean Jews